Marco Antonio Serna Díaz (11 July 1936 – 31 December 1991) was a Colombian herpetologist, ornithologist, and naturalist.

Life
Serna was born to Marco Antonio Serna and Anna Judith Díaz in San Vicente Ferrer in Antioquia, Colombia. On 20 June 1950 he entered the Institute of the Brothers of the Christian Schools in San Pedro, Antioquia, where he discovered his love for natural sciences. From 1956 to 1958 he studied in San Antonio de Prado. On 10 January 1962 he made his perpetual profession at the Institute of the Brothers of the Christian Schools (La Salle Brothers). 

He was curator of birds, amphibians, and reptiles at the Museo de La Salle in Bogotá, and professor of ornithology at the University of Antioquia.  He curated for the Natural Sciences Museum of the Colegio de San Jose de La Salle en Medellin, where he was based of for many years.  His scientific rigor inspired many science careers in the high-schoolers under his influence.  
Serna was both president of the Sociedad Antioqueña de Ornitología which he co-founded in 1984, and the Asociación Colombiana de Ornitología, two notable ornithological organisations in Colombia.

Together with Juan Arturo Rivero, a herpetologist from Puerto Rico, he described several new frog species, including Pristimantis dorsopictus, Pristimantis johannesdei, Hyloxalus breviquartus, Pseudopaludicola ceratophryes, and Colostethus ramirezi.

In 1971, he collected the last known specimen of the Antioquia brush finch (Atlapetes blancae).

In 2012, the newly described Antioquia wren (Thryophilus sernai) was named in his honour. In 1984, Rivero described the frog species Eleutherodactylus sernai which was later synonymized with Eleutherodactylus cerastes (Lynch, 1975).

References

1936 births
1991 deaths
Herpetologists
Colombian ornithologists
20th-century Colombian zoologists